Saint Andrew North West is a parliamentary constituency of Grenada.

Members

Election results

2022

References

Constituencies of Grenada